Tom Moore (born May 12, 1965) is an Assistant Head Coach at the University of Connecticut. This is his second stint at UConn after previously serving as an assistant from 1994 to 2007 under Huskies' Hall of Fame and three-time NCAA Championship coach, Jim Calhoun. Moore is also the former head men's basketball coach at Quinnipiac University, taking over the position vacated by Joe DeSantis in 2007 after 13 years at UConn and five seasons of previous head coaching experience at Worcester State College. Moore is a 1983 graduate of Saint Johns Shrewsbury and is a 1987 graduate of Boston University.

Head coaching record

NCAA DIII

NCAA DI

References

1965 births
Living people
American men's basketball coaches
Assumption Greyhounds men's basketball coaches
Boston University alumni
UConn Huskies men's basketball coaches
Place of birth missing (living people)
Quinnipiac Bobcats men's basketball coaches